Erkko is a Finnish family known for their ownership of the newspaper Helsingin Sanomat

Family members 
 J. H. Erkko  (1849–1906), Finnish poet and playwright
 Eero Erkko (1860–1927), Finnish politician, journalist and the founder of Päivälehti, brother of J. H. Erkko
 Eljas Erkko (1895–1965), Finnish politician, journalist and the main owner of Sanoma, son of Eero Erkko
 Aatos Erkko (1932–2012), Finnish journalist and the main owner of Sanoma, son of Eljas Erkko

Finnish families